Balrothery is a village and civil parish located in Fingal, Ireland. The town has historically been called in Irish Baile Ruairí (Town of Ruairí).

The 2016 census population for Balrothery was 2,017.

Geography
The village is located about 2 km south of Balbriggan on the R132, previously the old N1 Dublin-Belfast road.

History

Balrothery is also the name of two ancient baronies in the old county of Dublin. Although largely obsolete now, these administrative units have their origins in the Norman conquest of Ireland. A single feudal barony of Balrothery was held in 1343 by Richard Costentyn for one knight's fee. It is one of the seven which constituted the overlordship of Fingal dating back to 1208. It was later split into the baronies of Balrothery East and Balrothery West. Since 1994, the barony has been an integral part of the modern county of Fingal. The village and eponymous civil parish are located in Balrothery East. It is dominated by the tower of the medieval church of St Peter, which stands on the southern edge of the village. The church has now been de-consecrated and functions as the local heritage centre.

Education
Balrothery has one primary level national school, named after the saint Oliver Plunkett. Most students continue second level education in Balbriggan Community College, Loreto College, Balbriggan for girls, Ardgillan Community College, Skerries Community College or Gormanston College.

Sport 
Balrothery Balbriggan Tennis Club, located in the village's Glebe South Park, is a Tennis Ireland approved club serving Balrothery, Balbriggan and surrounding areas.

North County Cricket Club was founded in 1985 after a merger of Balrothery and Man-O-War cricket clubs. Balbriggan Golf Club borders Balrothery village.

Balrothery Football Club is a local association football (soccer) club, and local GAA clubs include O'Dwyers GAA in near-by Balbriggan and Man-O-War GFC to the south of the village.

Notable people
Nicholas Hill, Dean of St Patrick’s Cathedral, Dublin
Anne Cassin, RTÉ news and television presenter.
John Mooney & Paul Mooney, Irish International Cricketers.
Mikey Graham, Actor and member of Irish boyband Boyzone

References

External links 

 balrothery.com
 Brief history of Balrothery and surrounding areas
 St. Oliver Plunkett's, Balrothery National School online
 North County Cricket Club
 Balrothery Balbriggan Tennis Club
 Balrothery Angling Club (Wavin Lake & Delvin River)

Towns and villages in Fingal
Civil parishes of the barony of Balrothery East
Townlands of Fingal